Ashley Isham (born Eshamuddin Ismail in Singapore in 1976) is a fashion designer. He is currently based in London.

Ashley left Singapore in 1996 to take a pattern cutting course at the London College of Fashion, and was later accepted into Middlesex University afterwards.

He set up his own label "Ashley Isham" in 2000. In 2001, he also opened a boutique called Acquaint, hoping to "promote fashion talent and support other young designers", quoted from his website. Following this, he opened his flagship boutique, Ashley, in 2005.

In 2007, Ashley was awarded by Berita Harian, the Top Achiever of the Year.

References

External links
Ashley Isham's official website

1976 births
Singaporean fashion designers
Alumni of Middlesex University
Living people